Striolata is a monotypic genus of gastropods belonging to the family Cochlostomatidae. The only species is  Striolata striolata.

The species is found in Mediterranean, Pacific Ocean.

References

 Wagner, A. J. (1897). Monographie der Gattung Pomatias Studer. Denkschriften der Kaiserlichen Akademie der Wissenschaften, mathematisch-naturwissenschaftliche Classe. 64: 565-632, pls 1-10. Wien

External links
 Wagner, A. J. (1897). Monographie der Gattung Pomatias Studer. Denkschriften der Kaiserlichen Akademie der Wissenschaften, mathematisch-naturwissenschaftliche Classe. 64: 565-632, pls 1-10. Wien

Diplommatinidae
Monotypic gastropod genera